Daryll-Ann was a Dutch rock band stemming from Ermelo, Netherlands. Between 1992 and 2004 the band released six studio albums, plus one live album. Daryll-Ann was the first signing of Dutch label Excelsior Recordings.

History

Early days (1988–1991)

In the summer break of 1988 four high school students – Jelle and Coen Paulusma, Jeroen Vos and Frank van der Bij – decided to form a band. Before long Anne Soldaat joined the fold and rounded out the line-up. They took the name Daryll-Ann, based on a character that appeared in the American television show Hill Street Blues. At this stage the band drew its influences from punk records and songs by The Cure.

After the band members graduated from high school, they separately moved to Utrecht and Amsterdam to continue their studies. Still the band managed to record a first EP on the small Kelt label. It was received well by various music reviewers.

Renko (1992)
In 1992 the band played at the Noorderslag festival in Groningen, an important showcase for new talent. Later that year their debut album Renko saw the light of day, released on the Solid label. Like the band's name, the album’s name is based on a Hill Street Blues character

Hut Records (1993–1995)
A representative of Hut Records got hold of a Daryll-Ann demo and communicated that the label was interested in signing the band. But the label, a sublabel of Virgin Records, faced objection from Solid, with whom the band was still under contract. After a lengthy dispute, an agreement was reached, and Daryll-Ann signed to Hut Records.

The first fruit of this new partnership was the EP I Could Never Love You. This EP marks the first time that drummer Jeroen Kleijn recorded with the band. In 1994 I Could Never Love You was released in both the Netherlands and in the UK. The British press was very enthusiastic about the EP and Melody Maker even proclaimed it single of the week.

Daryll-Ann played the two biggest festivals in the Netherlands, Pinkpop and Lowlands. The band also played a multitude of shows in the UK, including concerts with The Smashing Pumpkins, The Verve and Cracker.

Hut Records, convinced of the band’s potential, budgeted 50 thousand euro for the recording of the band’s album. The band recorded in Studio Sound Enterprise, with Frans Hagenaars as producer. When the CD Seaborne West was released in 1995, it received rave reviews from both the Dutch and the British press. Melody Maker once again declared a Daryll-Ann song single of the week, this time "Stay". The band undertook an extensive European tour with Bettie Serveert. In August Seaborne West also got a US release. Even though press reviews were positive, CD sales were disappointing. This, combined with the fact that Hut Records was in serious financial trouble, caused a discontinuation of the band’s contract.

Excelsior Recordings (1996–2004)
The band did not have to wait for a new record label for long, as manager Ferry Roseboom and producer Frans Hagenaars decided to form Excelsior Recordings in 1996. Daryll-Ann was one of the first bands to record for the label. Under the guidance of producer Hagenaars the band created the Weeps album. This record too received very positive reviews, but it failed to sell, much to the disappointment of the band members. In August Daryll-Ann played at the Lowlands festival for a second time.

After a hiatus the band returned for the Marlboro Flashback Tour in 1998, a special tour where Daryll-Ann covered a set of Byrds songs. The band initiated recording their next album Happy Traum. Produced by Hagenaars once more, the album was released in 1999. Positive reviews followed, but a breakthrough still did not become a reality.

In 2000 the band submitted a track to the album Trillend Op Mijn Benen, a tribute to popular Dutch band Doe Maar. After that the live album DA Live was released, a retrospective of ten years of Daryll-Ann. Bass player Jeroen Vos took this occasion to bid his farewells; he was replaced by Dick Brouwers.

The next album Trailer Tales took a little more time to come around. By this time Jelle Paulusma had taken the responsibility of group leader. He recorded a large portion of the songs by himself, and most of the tracks on the album were written by him. The album was named Trailer Tales as Paulusma composed most of the songs for the album in a secluded trailer caravan. When the album was released in 2002, it was seen as a departure from previous releases; nonetheless its quality was praised by the press. There was a lot of media attention, but the sales numbers were not as high as hoped.

In late 2003 the band hired J.B. Meijers as the producer for their next studio album. In addition to producing, Meijers also assisted in songwriting, arranging and engineering. On February 16, 2004, the album Don’t Stop was released. As opposed to Trailer Tales this album sounded like a true band album again. An extensive tour followed, but on May 26, 2004, the band decided to call it a day and quit. No specific reason was given. All remaining concert dates were canceled.

Post Daryll-Ann
Until 2006 the band members lay low. Jelle Paulusma was the first to break the silence and released his first solo album under the moniker Paulusma. Anne Soldaat in the meantime assisted in producing GEM’s second album and released his first solo album under the moniker of Do-The-Undo in January 2007. His second solo album titled 'In Another Life' was released in 2009. Next to touring with his own band Soldaat toured with Tim Knol, whose debut album 'Tim Knol' was released in January 2010. Both Soldaat and Jeroen Klein play on this album. Jeroen Kleijn plays the drums on the two albums by the band Johan;  THX JHN and 4, and he is the drummer in a Dutch experimental band Spinvis.

Reunion
In August 2013 the band announced the plans for a new tour in 2014, in order to promote the reissues of their albums. The box "Daryll-Ann Again" that was released in December 2013 contains all the albums of the band, with additional demo and rare recordings.

Band members
Jelle Paulusma - Vocals, guitar, keyboards
Anne Soldaat – Guitar, vocals
Coen Paulusma - Vocals (1988–1993, 1996–2004)
Jeroen Vos – Bass guitar (1988–2001)
Dick Brouwers – Bass guitar (2001–2004)
Frank van der Bij - Drums (1988–1993)
Jeroen Kleijn - Drums (1993–2004)

Discography
 Renko (1992)
 I Could Never Love You (EP, 1994)
 Seaborne West (1995)
 Weeps (1996)
 Happy Traum (1999)
 DA Live (2000)
 Trailer Tales (2002)
 Don’t Stop (2004)

References

Dutch musicians
Dutch alternative rock groups
Musical groups from Gelderland
Ermelo, Netherlands